Portrait of a Woman (Marie Larp) is an oil-on-canvas portrait painting by the Dutch Golden Age painter Frans Hals, painted ca.1635–1638 and now in the National Gallery at London.

Painting 
The painting shows a fashionably dressed woman seated in a chair and holding her bridal stomacher with her left hand. This painting was documented by Ernst Wilhelm Moes in 1909 and Hofstede de Groot in 1910, who wrote:232. MARIA LARP (buried November 15, 1675), wife of Pieter Tjarck. M. 78. Half-length, in a painted oval. She faces three- quarters left and looks at the spectator. Her left hand is at her bosom; the right hand is not shown. She wears a white cap, a ruff, a black dress embroidered with white at the bosom, and lace wristbands. The colour of the face is very life-like. [Pendant to 231.] Panel, 30 inches by 27 inches. See Moes, Iconographia Batava, No. 4378. Exhibited at Brussels, 1882. Sale. Comte d'Oultremont, Brussels, June 27, 1889 (Arnold and Tripp). In the possession of the Paris dealers Arnold and Tripp. In the collection of W. C. Alexander, London.

This portrait has a pendant painting, depicting her husband Pieter Tjarck, which today is in the  collection of the Los Angeles County Museum of Art at Los Angeles:

See also
Pieter Tjarck

References

External links
 Painting info at museum

1630s paintings
Larp, Marie
Collections of the National Gallery, London
Larp, Marie